Naples United Football Club is an American semi-professional soccer club based in Naples, Florida, that plays in the National Premier Soccer League, the top semi-professional football league in the United States.

History
Naples United Football Club joined the National Premier Soccer League for its 2017 season. During their first season, the club finished last in the Sunshine Conference, winning just 1 of their 11 matches. The next season, in 2018, Naples United FC finished in 5th in the conference, once again failing to qualify for the playoffs.

In 2019, the club managed to finish in their highest ever position in the Sunshine Conference, finishing in 2nd place and qualifying for the Sunshine Conference Playoffs. However, during the playoffs, the club was defeated in the first round by Miami United FC. Despite the defeat, Naples United FC's results in 2019 allowed them to qualify for the 2020 U.S. Open Cup, the top domestic cup competition in American soccer.

Statistics and records

Season-by-season

See also
 National Premier Soccer League

References

External links

 
Naples United FC at Soccerway

 
Soccer clubs in Florida
National Premier Soccer League teams
Sports in Naples, Florida
Association football clubs established in 2017
2017 establishments in Florida